Established in 1987, the EU-Japan Centre for Industrial Cooperation is a unique venture  between the European Commission (Directorate General for Growth - Internal Market, Industry, Entrepreneurship and SMEs) and the Japanese Government (Ministry of Economy, Trade and Industry) (METI).

The EU-Japan Centre has its head office in Tokyo and an office in Brussels. It is headed by two General Managers, one European and one Japanese, and has a total staff of 30 people.

Mission
The mission of the EU-Japan Centre, a non-profit organization, is to enhance all forms of industrial, trade and investment cooperation between Japan and the EU, and to strengthen the technological capabilities and the competitiveness of the European and Japanese industrial systems.
The Centre was founded with a view to contributing to industrial cooperation between the Community and Japan, as specified in the Council Decision which constitutes the Centre’s legal basis.

History

Deliverables
Main deliverables so far include:  
 1,500 executives participating in business & training missions to Japan;
 150 EU and Japanese experts participating in Alternative Energy missions; 
 1,000 EU participants in Lean/Kaizen/WCM-related missions in Japan or Europe
 25,000 EU and Japanese participants in 300 policy seminars
 900 EU and Japanese engineering students participating in the Vulcanus programme.
 30 Cross-cultural events and 40 R&D-Innovation events
 200 analytical reports and e-learning webinars/videos
 3 regular newsletters (business-policy-R&D) reaching a total of ca 20,000 recipients
 12 partnership agreements contracted thanks to the EEN network

References

International trade organizations